Mozin may refer to:
Aleksandr Mozin (born 1961), Russian speed skater
Benoit Mozin (1769–1857), French composer
Théodore Mozin (1818–1850), French composer
Mozīn, a village in Sistan and Baluchestan Province, Iran